Elections to North Lanarkshire Council were held on 4 May 2017, on the same day as the 31 other local authorities in Scotland. The election utilised twenty-one wards with 77 Councillors being elected. This represented an increase of 7 seats and 1 additional ward when compared to 2012. Each ward elected either 3 or 4 members, using the STV electoral system.

The election saw the Scottish National Party overtake Labour as the largest party on the council. Despite the SNP winning the most seats and most votes, North Lanarkshire was run by a Labour administration supported by the Scottish Conservatives. Labour leader Jim Logue was appointed Leader of the Council with the support of Conservative and Independent councillors.

Election result

Note: "Votes" are the first preference votes. The net gain/loss and percentage changes relate to the result of the previous Scottish local elections on 3 May 2012. This may differ from other published sources showing gain/loss relative to seats held at dissolution of Scotland's councils.

Ward results

Kilsyth
2012: 2xLab; 1xSNP
2017: 2xLab; 1xSNP
2012-2017: No change

Cumbernauld North
2012: 2xLab; 1xCICA; 1xSNP; 
2017: 2xSNP; 1xLab; 1xCon
2012-2017 Change: SNP gain 1 seat from CICA; Con gain 1 seat from Lab

Cumbernauld South
2012: 2xLab; 2xSNP
2017: 3xSNP; 1xLab
2012-2017 Change: SNP gain one seat from Lab

Cumbernauld East
2017: 3xSNP; 1xLab
2012-2017 Change: New ward

 = Sitting Councillors for Abronhill, Kildrum and the Village Ward.
+ = Sitting Councillor for Cumbernauld South Ward.

Stepps, Chryston and Muirhead
2017: 1xSNP; 1xLab; 1xCon
2012-2017 Change: New ward

 

 = Sitting Councillors for Strathkelvin Ward.

Gartcosh, Glenboig and Moodiesburn
2017: 2xLab; 1xSNP
2012-2017 Change: New ward

 

 = Sitting Councillor for Coatbridge North and Glenboig Ward.

Coatbridge North
2017: 2xSNP; 2xLab
2007-2012 Change:  New ward

 

 = Sitting Councillors for Coatbridge North and Glenboig Ward.

Airdrie North
2012: 2xSNP; 2xLab
2017: 1xSNP; 1xLab; 1xInd; 1xCon
2012-2017 Change: Ind gain one seat from SNP; Con gain one seat from Lab

Airdrie Central
2012:  2xLab; 1xSNP
2017: 2xSNP; 1xLab; 1xCon
2012-2017 Change: 1 extra seat compared to 2012. Con gain one seat from Lab

Coatbridge West
2012: 2xLab; 1xSNP 
2017: 2xLab; 1xSNP
2012-2017 Change: No change

Coatbridge South
2012: 2xLab; 1xSNP 
2017: 2xLab; 2xSNP
2012-2017 Change: 1 extra seat compared to 2012

Airdrie South
2012: 2xLab; 2xSNP
2017: 2xSNP; 1xLab; 1xCon
2012-2017 Change: Con gain one seat from Lab

Fortissat
2012: 1xLab; 1xIndependent; 1xSNP 
2017: 2xLab; 1xSNP; 1xCon
2012-2017 Change: 1 extra seat compared to 2012

Thorniewood
2012: 2xLab; 1xSNP
2017: 2xLab; 1xSNP
2012-2017 Change: No change

Bellshill
2012: 2xLab; 1xSNP 
2017: 2xLab; 1xSNP; 1xCon
2012-2017 Change: 1 extra seat compared to 2012.

Mossend and Holytown
2012: 2xLab; 1xSNP 
2017: 2xLab; 1xSNP
2012-2017 Change:  No change

Motherwell West
2012: 2xLab; 1xSNP 
2017: 1xSNP; 1xLab; 1xCon
2012-2017 Change: Con gain one seat from Lab

Motherwell North
2012: 3xLab; 1xSNP 
2017: 2xLab; 2xSNP
2012-2017 Change: SNP gain one seat from Lab

Motherwell South East and Ravenscraig
2012: 3xLab; 1xSNP
2017: 2xSNP; 1xLab; 1xCon
2012-2017 Change: SNP gain one seat from Lab; Con gain one seat from Lab

Murdostoun
2012: 2xLab; 1xSNP; 1xIndependent 
2017: 1xIndependent; 1xSNP; 2xLab
2012-2017 Change: No change

Wishaw
2012: 2xLab; 2xSNP
2017: 2xSNP; 1xLab; 1xCon
2012-2017 Change: Conservative gain one seat from Lab

Changes since 2017
† Fortissat Conservative candidate, Sandy Thornton refused to sign his acceptance of office, resulting in the seat becoming vacant on 28 June 2017. A by-election took place on 7 September 2017 and was won by Clare Quigley of Scottish Labour.
†† On 8 May 2018, Councillor Tommy Cochrane resigned from The SNP and became an Independent citing lack of support from The SNP in Fortissat. He resigned his seat on 18 March 2020 saying he was increasingly unable to manage personal and work commitments.
††† On 22 May 2018 Councillor Stephen Goldsack of the Scottish Conservatives was expelled from the party after previous connections to the British National Party were exposed.
†††† On 19 June 2018, Councillor Paddy Hogg of Cumbernauld East resigned from The SNP. He described the SNP group as ‘toxic’. He now sits as an Independent.
††††† On 10 July 2018, Councillor David Baird of Mossend and Holytown was suspended from The SNP for 'breaking procedure'. He now sits as an Independent. He re-joined the party in 2018.
†††††† On 13 August 2018, Coatbridge South Labour Councillor Gordon Encinias died, having been unwell for some time. A by-election was held on 25 October and was held by Geraldine Woods of Scottish Labour.
††††††† On 1 Jul 2019, Thorniewood Labour Councillor Hugh Gaffney resigned his seat. He was elected as MP for Coatbridge, Chryston and Bellshill at the 2017 UK Parliament Election. A by-election was held on 19 September 2019 and the seat was retained by Labour.
†††††††† Thorniewood SNP Cllr Steven Bonnar was elected as MP for Coatbridge, Chryston and Bellshill at the 2019 UK Parliament Election. He resigned his Council seat and the by-election was set for May but was deferred until 19 November 2020.

By-elections since 2017

Fortissat (1)

Coatbridge South

Thorniewood (1)

Fortissat (2)

Thorniewood (2)

Murdostoun

References

North Lanarkshire Scottish Council elections

2017
2017 Scottish local elections